Abdullah Shaaban (born 12 June 1994) is a Kuwaiti karateka. He won the silver medal in the men's 60kg event at the 2021 Islamic Solidarity Games held in Konya, Turkey. He is also a two-time gold medalist in the men's 60kg event at the Asian Karate Championships (2018 and 2022).

Career 

He won the gold medal in the men's 60kg event at the 2018 Asian Karate Championships held in Amman, Jordan. He competed in the men's 60 kg event at the 2018 Asian Games held in Jakarta, Indonesia.

In 2021, he competed at the World Olympic Qualification Tournament held in Paris, France hoping to qualify for the 2020 Summer Olympics in Tokyo, Japan.

He competed in the men's kumite 60 kg event at the 2022 World Games held in Birmingham, United States.

Achievements

References

External links 
 

Living people
1994 births
Place of birth missing (living people)
Kuwaiti male karateka
Karateka at the 2018 Asian Games
Asian Games competitors for Kuwait
Islamic Solidarity Games medalists in karate
Islamic Solidarity Games competitors for Kuwait
Competitors at the 2022 World Games
21st-century Kuwaiti people